The 2017 Grand Prix Hassan II was a professional men's tennis tournament played on clay courts. It was the 33rd edition of the tournament and part of the 2017 ATP World Tour. It took place in Marrakesh, Morocco between 10 and 16 April 2017.

Point distribution

Singles main-draw entrants

Seeds 

 1 Rankings are as of April 3, 2017.

Other entrants 
The following players received wildcards into the singles main draw:
  Amine Ahouda 
  Grigor Dimitrov
  Reda El Amrani

The following players received entry from the qualifying draw:
  Taro Daniel 
  Laslo Đere
  Gianluigi Quinzi
  Sergiy Stakhovsky

The following players received entry as a lucky loser:
  Luca Vanni

Withdrawals 
Before the tournament
  Nikoloz Basilashvili →replaced by  Luca Vanni
  Damir Džumhur →replaced by  Paul-Henri Mathieu
  Karen Khachanov →replaced by  Radu Albot
  Andrey Kuznetsov →replaced by  Guillermo García López
  Daniil Medvedev →replaced by  Jérémy Chardy

Retirements 
  Federico Delbonis

Doubles main-draw entrants

Seeds 

 Rankings are as of April 3, 2017.

Other entrants 
The following pairs received wildcards into the doubles main draw:
  Amine Ahouda /  Reda El Amrani 
  Yassine Idmbarek /  Mehdi Jdi

Withdrawals 
During the tournament
  Carlos Berlocq

Finals

Singles 

  Borna Ćorić defeated  Philipp Kohlschreiber, 5–7, 7–6(7–3), 7–5.

Doubles 

  Dominic Inglot /  Mate Pavić defeated  Marcel Granollers /  Marc López, 6–4, 2–6, [11–9]

References

External links